McAnaney is a surname. Notable people with the surname include:

Gerry McAnaney (born 1957), Irish football administrator 
William McAnaney (1910–1987), Australian politician

See also
McAnany
McEnaney